10ml LOVE  (Take a sip) is a 2012 Indian romantic comedy film, produced by Sunil Joshi and directed by Sharat Katariya, starring Rajat Kapoor, Tisca Chopra, Purab Kohli, Koel Purie, Tara Sharma, and Neil Bhoopalam. Inspired by William Shakespeare's A Midsummer Night's Dream, the movie is a contemporary story set in an Indian milieu.

Plot
The film follows the relationship of three different couples whose stories intertwine. The first couple (Ghalib and Roshini), played by Rajat Kapoor and Tisca Chopra, have been married for seven years. However, the wife is constantly followed by her paranoid husband who works as a herbal potion vendor. The second couple (Shweta and Peter), played by Tara Sharma and Neil Bhoopalam, are in love and want to elope because Tara Sharma has a marriage arrangement. Her would-be groom, Neil, who is played by Purab Kohli, is also in a long-term, complex relationship with Minnie, played by Koel Purie. On the eve of their marriage, all three couples have assembled. The insecure husband strains his relationship due to his suspicious behavior and in an attempt to fix his married life, his mother gives him a herbal potion. 'Josh-E-Jawaani.' She tells him to give a minuscule portion to his wife to make her lust for him. He tries, but is unable to do so as his wife is moving to the jungle. The other two couples are thrown into a sticky situation when the men accidentally take a sip of the potion, falling in love with the girl escaping her husband. She moves toward the jungle to save herself from both possessed men while another bride follows the group to protect her boyfriend. The next day, while the men recover from the potion, everything returns to normal.

The movie has a humorous quote by a gossip-loving neighbor of Ghalib, complaining about her neglectful husband and his love for cricket: "Mujhse byah kyon kiya, Irfan Pathan ko hi ghar le aate." ("Why marry me and not just bring home Irfan Pathan?").

Box office
10ml LOVE  was reported a box office failure, with a grossed collection estimate of 0.69 crore against a budget of 1.25 crore.

Review
The Times of India rated the movie 2.5 out of 5 stars, and commented on the witty comedy and rough sketch of love stories, while criticizing the movie for lacking depth in its story and blurry camerawork.

“10ml Love is a light-hearted comedy with a quirky script and hilarious dialogues. Go for it!”

Cast
 Rajat Kapoor as Ghalib
 Tisca Chopra as Roshini
 Purab Kohli as Neel
 Koel Purie as Minnie 
 Tara Sharma as Shweta
 Neil Bhoopalam as Peter
 Brijendra Kala as Cook
 Manu Rishi as Chand
 Rasika Dugal
 Anusha Bose as Sabrina
 Sarita Joshi as Ghalib's Mother

External links

References 

2012 romantic comedy films
2012 films
2010s Hindi-language films
Indian romantic comedy films
Films based on A Midsummer Night's Dream
Modern adaptations of works by William Shakespeare